Daniel Faalele (born November 9, 1999) is an Australian professional American football offensive tackle for the Baltimore Ravens of the National Football League (NFL). He played college football at Minnesota.

Early life and high school career
Faalele was born on 9 November 1999 in Melbourne, Victoria, to a Samoan father and Tongan mother. According to a 2017 USA Today article, his father was 6'4" (1.94 m) tall, weighing 290 pounds (131 kg). Faalele played basketball and rugby as a youth until a member of the coaching staff of the University of Hawaiʻi football team discovered him while scouting players in Australia.

After participating in a local satellite camp run by Michigan head coach Jim Harbaugh and garnering interest from multiple Division I programs, Faalele was recruited to play football at IMG Academy in Bradenton, Florida. After only practising and learning the sport in 2016, he was a starter on IMG's offensive line in 2017 as the team went undefeated and he was selected to play in the 2018 Under Armour All-America Game. Faalele was rated a four star prospect and committed to play college football at Minnesota over offers from Alabama, Florida State, Georgia, LSU and Michigan.

College career
Faalele played in 10 games as a true freshman, starting the final eight games of the season at right tackle and was named honourable mention All-Big Ten Conference. Following the season, he was listed as one of Australia's 50 Greatest Living Athletes by GQ Australia. Faalele started 11 games at right tackle and was again named honorable mention All-Big Ten as a sophomore. As a junior in 2020, Faalele opted out of the season due to the COVID-19 crisis. Despite projections that Faalele would enter the 2021 NFL Draft, he decided to stay with Minnesota for his senior year. On 28 December 2021, in his final college game, he scored his first career touchdown in the Guaranteed Rate Bowl against West Virginia, with a two-yard run up the middle.

Professional career

Faalele was drafted by the Baltimore Ravens in the fourth round, 110th overall, of the 2022 NFL Draft. At , Faalele became the heaviest rostered player in the NFL.

References

External links
 Baltimore Ravens bio
Minnesota Golden Gophers bio

Living people
1999 births
American football offensive tackles
Australian expatriate sportspeople in the United States
Australian players of American football
Minnesota Golden Gophers football players
Sportspeople from Melbourne
IMG Academy alumni
Australian sportspeople of Samoan descent
Baltimore Ravens players